The Słupia is a river in north-western Poland.

Słupia may also refer to:
Słupia, Lesser Poland Voivodeship (south Poland)
Słupia, Skierniewice County in Łodź Voivodeship (central Poland)
Słupia, Busko County in Świętokrzyskie Voivodeship (south-central Poland)
Słupia, Jędrzejów County in Świętokrzyskie Voivodeship (south-central Poland)
Słupia, Końskie County in Świętokrzyskie Voivodeship (south-central Poland)
Słupia, Gmina Szczutowo in Masovian Voivodeship (east-central Poland)
Słupia, Gmina Zawidz in Masovian Voivodeship (east-central Poland)
Słupia, Greater Poland Voivodeship (west-central Poland)
Słupia, Pomeranian Voivodeship (north Poland)

See also